Bahareh (also Romanized as Bahāreh; also known as Solţānābād, Solţānābād-e Anūch, Solţānābād-e Anūj, and Sultānābād) is a village in Sefidkuh Rural District, Samen District, Malayer County, Hamadan Province, Iran. At the 2006 census, its population was 1,481, in 377 families.

References 

Populated places in Malayer County